Ozlem Altin (born 1977) is a German and Turkish visual artist living and working in Berlin, Germany

Biography 
Born in 1977 in Goch, Germany, Ozlem Altin studied at the Utrecht School of the Arts (HKU) and holds an MA degree from Piet Zwart Institute, both in the Netherlands. Upon completing her studies, she was the recipient of the Fonds BKVB, The Netherlands Foundation for Visual Arts, Design and Architecture for work and publishing, which helped Altin found the independent publishing platform Orient Press to publish and distribute artist books. 

In 2020 her work was included in the New Photography 2020 online exhibition at MoMA

Work 
Ozlem Altin constitutes an archive of her own photographs and found images, including other artists’ works and material from museum collections, the Internet and mass media, she then selectively activates imagery from this archive through collages, photographs and painting, creating multilayered constellations. Her research focuses on the body, inanimate body parts and the artefact in motion. According to curator Lucy Gallun, symbols, such as the mask, the heron, the mermaid, "embody something part human, part animal", "a state of in-between-ness, and they appear again and again in her work". In a 2010 interview with Mousse Magazine, the artist states that she is "interested in staging the human body in a zero condition, in a state of exhaustion and passivity". In a critical text, Vanessa Müller elaborates on this idea in contrast to "the spectactular": "a repertoire of frozen poses, mute gestures and inert people evolves, presenting themselves to the discriminating gaze as objects while noneteless slipping away again and again".

References 

Living people
1977 births
German contemporary artists